Italy–Kazakhstan relations refer to bilateral relations between the Italian Republic and the Republic of Kazakhstan.

More than 12% of Kazakhstan exports in 2019 (approx. $7.25 billion) went to Italy - second only to China, and most of any other country in Europe, including Russia, which shares a border with Kazakhstan. The Italian state oil company owns a 16.8% stake in the Kashagan oil field in Kazakhstan's Caspian Sea basin, and a 29.25% stake in the Karachaganak gas field with the Kazakhstan state oil company KazMunayGas.

List of Italian ambassadors  
 Diego Lorenzo Longo 2002–2006
 Bruno Antonio Pasquino 2006–2011
 Alberto Pieri 2011–2014
 Stefano Ravagnan 2014–2018
 Pasquale D'Avino from 5 April 2018–present

See also 
 Foreign relations of Italy 
 Foreign relations of Kazakhstan 
 Kazakhstan–EU relations

References

 
Kazakhstan
Bilateral relations of Kazakhstan